Geertruidenberg is a city and municipality in the province North Brabant in the south of the Netherlands. The city, named after Saint Gertrude of Nivelles, received city rights in 1213 from the count of Holland. The fortified city prospered until the 15th century.

Today, the municipality of Geertruidenberg also includes the population centres Raamsdonk and Raamsdonksveer. The city government consists of the mayor Willemijn van Hees and three aldermen.

History

Geertruidenberg is named after Saint Gertrude of Nivelles.

In 1213, Sint Geertruidenberg (English: "Saint Gertrude's Mountain") received city rights from Count William I of Holland. The fortified city became a trade center, where counts and other nobility gathered for negotiations. The Hook and Cod wars in 1420 and the Saint Elizabeth's flood in 1421 ended the prosperity of the city.

During the Eighty Years War the city was captured by an English, French Huguenot and Fleming force in 1573 - in a surprise attack. In 1589 however the city was betrayed to Parma by its English garrison. It was finally recaptured by an Anglo-Dutch force under the command of Maurice of Nassau in the summer of 1593.

Today, Geertruidenberg is part of the province of North Brabant, but it was once part of the county of Holland. Geertruidenberg is the second oldest city of Holland as it was the first to receive city rights. It is a common misconception that Geertruidenberg is the oldest city of the Netherlands, because the names Holland and the Netherlands are used interchangeably by some.

Geography

The municipality of Geertruidenberg comprises three population centres:
Geertruidenberg
Raamsdonk
Raamsdonksveer

Geertruidenberg is located on the bank of the Donge, close to where this river flows into the Amer.

Demography

Government

The mayor of Geertruidenberg is Willemijn van Hees (VVD) and she was appointed mayor by the Dutch monarch, like all mayors in the Netherlands. The three aldermen of Geertruidenberg are Kevin van Oort (Groenlinks/D66), Adriaan de Jongh (CDA),and Bert van den Kieboom (Uw 3 Kernen). Together, the mayor and the aldermen form the College van Burgemeester en Wethouders, which is supported by the city's secretary Richard Nagtzaam.

The city council is elected every four years during municipal elections, at the same time as in most other municipalities of the Netherlands. The 19 members of the city council assemble ten times per year for public meetings in the city hall in Raamsdonksveer. The council members come from eight political parties, three local and five national (2014):

Notable people 

 Johannes Vollevens (1649 in Geertruidenberg – 1728) a Dutch Golden Age painter
 Juliana de Lannoy (1738 – 1782 in St. Geertruidenberg) an artist and poet, lived in St. Geertruidenberg from 1758
 Willem Sassen (1918 in Geertruidenberg – 2002) a Dutch collaborator, Nazi journalist, a member of the Waffen-SS and the interviewer of Adolf Eichmann in 1960
 Jan Derksen (1919 in Geertruidenberg – 2011) a Dutch professional cyclist, world professional track sprint champion in 1946 and 1957
 Matthijs Brouwer (born 1980 in Raamsdonk) a field hockey player, team silver medallist at the 2004 Summer Olympics

Gallery

References

External links

Official website

 
Cities in the Netherlands
Municipalities of North Brabant
Populated places in North Brabant